The Peoples Champ is the second studio album by American rapper Paul Wall. It was released on September 13, 2005, by Swishahouse, Atlantic Records and Asylum Records. The album debuted at number one on the US Billboard 200, selling 176,000 copies in its first week. This serves as his first number one in two solo studio releases, after Chick Magnet (2004). The album was supported by four singles: "Sittin' Sidewayz" featuring Big Pokey, "They Don't Know", "Girl" and "Drive Slow" (Kanye West featuring Paul Wall and GLC). Both "Sittin' Sidewayz" and "Girl" are certified gold by the RIAA for selling more than 500,000 copies each in the United States.

The limited edition of The Peoples Champ features two CDs: disc one contains the original album, while disc two contains the "screwed and chopped" version by DJ Michael "5000" Watts. The Watts mix was released as a stand-alone CD the following week.

Critical reception

The Peoples Champ received generally positive reviews from music critics who found Wall better than fellow Houston rapper Mike Jones. Pitchfork writer Tom Breihan credited newcomer producer Grid Iron for providing some consistent beats throughout the album and Wall for being an above-average rapper saying, "So Wall is a good rapper, but not a great one. But then, this is 2005, and all a rapper needs to make a good album is enough great, complementary beats and guest appearances to keep the whole thing interesting all the way through." AllMusic's Andy Kellman also praised Wall as a rapper, saying his flow is something that "always fits into the fabric of the track." Jonah Weiner of Blender lauded Wall's ability to lace crafty wordplay about the typical hip-hop tropes, saying that "This is materialism at its most mesmerizing." K. B. Tindal of HipHopDX praised the album for its party tracks but was looking for some substance throughout it, saying that "After actually listening to the project it was worth the wait but still could have been a little more introspective with more heartfelt tracks. [...] For the most part it is what it is; shit-talking made to sound good." Usman Sajjad of The Situation praised the album for its production and catchy party tracks, concluding that "With new hustles like his grills and various endorsements with Reebok and other companies, Paul Wall gives evidence with his debut 'The People’s Champ', that Houston still flows strongly through his blood, whilst moving one foot into mainstream Hip Hop."

Track listing

Sample credits
 "I'm a Playa" samples "I Got That Drank" performed by Frayser Boy, Mike Jones, and Paul Wall, and "Still Tippin'" performed by Mike Jones, Slim Thug, and Paul Wall.
 "They Don't Know" samples "Pimp tha Pen" performed by DJ Screw and Lil' Keke, "Murder" performed by UGK, "3rd Coast" performed by Fat Pat, and "Wood Wheel" performed by UGK.
 "Smooth Operator" samples "Never Know What You Can Do (Give It a Try)" as written and performed by Leroy Hutson.
 "Sittin' Sidewayz" samples "June 27th (Part 2)" performed by DJ Screw, Big Moe, and Big Pokey of S.U.C.
 "Internet Going Nutz" samples "Still Tippin'" performed by Mike Jones, Slim Thug, and Paul Wall.
 "Sippin' Tha Barre" samples "Get Crunk" performed by Crooked Lettaz and Pimp C.
 "Girl" samples "Oh Girl" performed by Chi-Lites as written and performed by Eugene Record.
 "Just Paul Wall" samples "Long Ago and Far Away" performed by Earl Klugh.

Charts and certifications

Weekly charts

Year-end charts

Certifications

See also
List of Billboard 200 number-one albums of 2005
List of Billboard number-one R&B albums of 2005

References

2005 albums
Paul Wall albums
Asylum Records albums
Atlantic Records albums
Albums produced by Kanye West
Albums produced by Mike Dean (record producer)
Albums produced by DJ Paul
Albums produced by Juicy J